Halogen acne is caused by iodides, bromides and fluorides (halogens) that induce an acneiform eruption similar to that observed with steroids.

See also 
 Halogenoderma
 List of cutaneous conditions

References 

Acneiform eruptions